The Royal Collection Management Committee has control of the administration of the Royal Collection of the Sovereign of the United Kingdom, and is a part of the Royal Collection Department of the Royal Household.

Current (July 2005) members are:

Sir Hugh Roberts, KCVO FSA (Chairman)
Sir Jonathan Marsden, KCVO FSA
Hon Lady Roberts, CVO
Desmond Shawe-Taylor
Mike Stevens, LVO FCA
George Ruiz, ACA
Ms Frances Dunkels
Mrs Nuala McGourty

References

British monarchy